The Aceair AERIKS 200 is a Swiss sports plane of highly unusual design. It is being marketed in kitplane form. The AERIKS 200 has a highly streamlined, bullet-shaped fuselage, with a T-tail and large ventral fin, pusher propeller, and canard. The pilot and passenger are seated in tandem. Development aircraft used a fixed undercarriage, but Aceair was planning to offer a version with retractable landing gear.

Status
Aceair ceased operation in 2004, and with it the Aeriks 200 project was cancelled.  This was principally due to Diamond Engines cancelling the manufacture of the rotary engine the 200 was based around.
Some assets of the company were purchased by a pair of entrepreneurs, and so the Aeriks 200 may eventually see commercial launch someday.

Specifications (Aeriks A-200)

References

 Jackson, Paul. Jane's All The World's Aircraft 2003–2004. Coulsdon, UK:Jane's Information Group, 2003. .

External links
 http://www.canardzone.com/forum/showpost.php?p=11756&postcount=6
 https://web.archive.org/web/20091020131559/http://www.over-flyer.ch/
http://www.flightsim.com
FS2004 WoW-Aeriks GA Swiss Aircraft
Name: waaeriks.zip
Size: 4,531,007 Date: 02-28-2007 Downloads: 3,889
FS2004 WoW-Aeriks GA Swiss Aircraft, tri-surface. Aeriks by Aeris (CH) model made by WoWAir Design and artwork by WoWAir. A totally animated Gmax model including flex wings, ailerons, elevators, rudders, spoilers (not real), trim tab, landing gear, steering wheel, 3D propeller, smoke access canopy, pilots.

Abandoned civil aircraft projects
2000s Swiss sport aircraft
Wankel-engined aircraft
Single-engined pusher aircraft
Aircraft manufactured in Switzerland
T-tail aircraft
Aircraft first flown in 2002
Mid-wing aircraft